Pakistan Petroleum Limited (PPL) is a Pakistani state-owned petroleum company. It was incorporated on 5 June 1950, when it inherited the assets and liabilities of the Burmah Oil Company Ltd. which initially holds 70% of the share with the rest mostly held by the government of Pakistan (GoP). As of June 2011, Government of Pakistan held 70.66% of the shares.

The company is headquartered in Karachi. It operates major oil and gas fields, including the Sui gas field, has non-operating interests in other fields, and has an interest in an exploration portfolio onshore and offshore. The company's Managing Director reports to the Petroleum Secretary of Pakistan. In 1997, the old company Burmah Oil Company of the United Kingdom sold all its remaining equity in this company to the Government of Pakistan.

Operations
PPL is operator and shares 100% in two fields:
 Kandhkot gas field was discovered in 1959 but due to low demand, production did not begin until 1987. It was hit by flood in August 2010 and one of the gas gathering mains (GGM) submerged completely and two GGMs partly. There were 25 producing wells out of which 15 were shut-in. Eight wells were bought into operation by September 2010. In December 2010, compression station began commercial operation to maintain contractual delivery pressure and enhance recovery ratio.
 Sui gas field was discovered in 1952 and is PPL's flagship natural gas project. It is under depletion phase, gas sales during the financial year 2010–2011 was  against  in 2009–2010. Production commenced from two development wells and a third well spud-in during the fiscal year 2010–2011. Drilling of well Sui-92U was started in March 2010. The well was drilled up to the depth of 2,128 meters in the Pab reservoir and was successfully completed as a single string producer from Sui upper limestone (SUL) in December 2010. Drilling of well Sui-89M started in January 2011 and was completed in February 2011. Sui-93M was drilled as a horizontal well using under-balanced drilling technology in the reservoir for the first time in the country to optimise field production. Well drilling started in March 2011 and completed in July 2011.

Partners operated producing fields 
 Block 2669-3 (Latif)
 Block 2668-4 (Gambat)
 Block-2768-3 (Block-22)
 Block 3370-3 (Tal)
 Manzalai field
 Makori field
 Mamikhel discovery
 Maramzai discovery
 Makori East discovery
 Tolang discovery
 Block 3370-10 (Nashpa)
 Miano gas field
 Qadirpur gas field
 Sawan gas field

Bolan Mining Enterprises
Bolan Mining Enterprises is a joint venture on equal basis between Pakistan Petroleum and the government of Baluchistan. A grinding mill having a capacity of 50,000 tonnes per year was set up and has met almost 80% of the total barytes required by oil exportation companies operating in Pakistan. Bolan barytes are produced in accordance with the American Petroleum Institute specifications. Bolan has been authorised by API to use their 'official nomogram' on Bolan barytes.

During the financial year 2010–2011, the sales of barytes was 41,316 tonnes and Bolan earned a pre-tax profit of PKR 138.864 million from barytes project Khuzdar as compared to PKR 148.800 million earned in 2009–2010. A sum of PKR 27.440 million appropriated towards reserves for development and expansion. The company's net 50% share of the profit was PKR 55.712 million during the financial period 2010–2011.

Discoveries in Sindh, Balochistan
In December 2019, Pakistan Petroleum announced that it had made new discoveries of fresh oil and gas deposits in Sindh and Balochistan.

References

External links 
 
Corporate Profile Overview of Pakistan Petroleum Limited

Oil and gas companies of Pakistan
Government-owned companies of Pakistan
Burmah-Castrol
Companies based in Karachi
Energy companies established in 1950
Non-renewable resource companies established in 1950
Companies listed on the Pakistan Stock Exchange
Multinational companies headquartered in Pakistan
Pakistani companies established in 1950